Gazvar-e Olya (also Romanized as Gazvar-e ‘Olyā and Gazūr-e ‘Olyā; also known as Kazvaz-e ‘Olyā) is a village in Sanjabad-e Shomali Rural District, in the Central District of Kowsar County, Ardabil Province, Iran. At the 2006 census, its population was 132, in 31 families.

References 

Tageo

Towns and villages in Kowsar County